Jor Kore Bhalobasha Hoy Na is a 2013 Bangladeshi action thriller film. The film directed by Shahadat Hossain Liton and produced by Abdul Mabud Kawser under the banner of Tushar Kotha Chitra. It feature Shakib Khan, Sahara and Ayesha Salma Mukti in lead roles. Misha Sawdagor, Sadek Bachchu, Ali Raj and others also played important roles in the film. It is the first digital film starring by Shakib Khan. It was remake of 2002 Hindi film Tumko Na Bhool Paayenge starring by Salman Khan and Sushmita Sen.

Story
Saniyat Ahmed Robi (Shakib Khan) is the only son of retired Major Mansur Ali Khan and Kajal (Sahara) is the daughter of retired Police Commissioner Ashraf Chowdhury. The duo love each other. When the two families become acquainted, they also accept this love. They agree to their marriage. But a group of terrorists carried out a surprise attack on the wedding ceremony.

Cast
 Shakib Khan as Saniyat Ahmed Robi aka Surja
 Sahara as Kajal
 Ayesha Salma Mukti as Shobha
 Shahid Khan
 Misha Sawdagor as Usman
 Sadek Bachchu as Aslam
 Ali Raj
 Rehana Jolly
 Gulshan Ara Popy
 Nasrin
 Bobby
 Jackie
 Subrata
 Kabila
 Afzal Sharif

Release
The film released in almost 47 theatres on February 1, 2013.

Soundtrack

References

External links
 
Bengali-language Bangladeshi films
Bangladeshi remakes of Indian films